The 2022–23 Cleveland Cavaliers season is the 53rd season for the franchise in the National Basketball Association (NBA). This season, the Cavaliers made a blockbuster move to bring Donovan Mitchell to the Cavaliers in exchange for Ochai Agbaji, Collin Sexton, Lauri Markkanen and future picks. On March 14, 2023 The Cleveland Cavaliers matched their win total of last season with a 120-104 win over the Charlotte Hornets to improve to 44-27.

Draft 

The Cavaliers owned their first round pick which they used to select Ochai Agbaji. They also had three second-round picks.

Roster

Standings

Division

Conference

Game log

Preseason 

|-style="background:#fcc;"
| 1
| October 5
| @ Philadelphia
| 
| Donovan Mitchell (16)
| Kevin Love (7)
| Donovan Mitchell (5)
| Wells Fargo Center19,793
| 0–1
|-style="background:#fcc;"
| 2
| October 10
| Philadelphia
| 
| Jarrett Allen (19)
| Jarrett Allen (12)
| Darius Garland (7)
| Rocket Mortgage FieldHouse13,648
| 0–2
|-style="background:#cfc;"
| 3
| October 12
| Atlanta
| 
| Donovan Mitchell (24)
| Mamadi Diakite (11)
| Darius Garland (12)
| Rocket Mortgage FieldHouse13,072
| 1–2
|-style="background:#fcc;
| 4
| October 14
| @ Orlando
| 
| Isaac Okoro (17)
| Cedi Osman (9)
| LeVert, I. Mobley, Nembhard (3)
| Amway Center17,063
| 1–3

Regular season

|-style="background:#fcc;"
| 1
| October 19
| @ Toronto
| 
| Donovan Mitchell (31)
| Jarrett Allen (10)
| Donovan Mitchell (9)
| Scotiabank Arena19,800
| 0–1
|-style="background:#cfc;"
| 2
| October 22
| @ Chicago
| 
| Donovan Mitchell (32)
| Kevin Love (12)
| LeVert, Mitchell (8)
| United Center21,089
| 1–1
|-style="background:#cfc;"
| 3
| October 23
| Washington
| 
| Donovan Mitchell (37)
| Jarrett Allen (14)
| LeVert, Mitchell (4)
| Rocket Mortgage FieldHouse19,432
| 2–1
|-style="background:#cfc;"
| 4
| October 26
|  Orlando
| 
| Evan Mobley (22)
| Jarrett Allen (16)
| Donovan Mitchell (8)
| Rocket Mortgage FieldHouse19,432
| 3–1
|-style="background:#cfc;"
| 5
| October 28
| @ Boston
| 
| LeVert, Mitchell (41)
| Jarrett Allen (11)
| Caris LeVert (7)
| TD Garden 19,156
| 4–1
|-style="background:#cfc;"
| 6
| October 30
| New York
| 
| Donovan Mitchell (38)
| Jarrett Allen (13)
| Donovan Mitchell (12)
| Rocket Mortgage FieldHouse 19,432
| 5–1

|-style="background:#cfc;"
| 7
| November 2
| Boston
| 
| Darius Garland (29)
| Jarrett Allen (14)
| Darius Garland (12)
| Rocket Mortgage FieldHouse 19,432
| 6–1
|-style="background:#cfc;"
| 8
| November 4
| @ Detroit
| 
| Jarrett Allen (23)
| E. Mobley, Love (8)
| Kevin Love (10)
| Little Caesars Arena 18,744
| 7–1
|-style="background:#cfc;"
| 9
| November 6
| @ L.A. Lakers
| 
| Donovan Mitchell (33)
| Jarrett Allen (11)
| Darius Garland (7)
| Crypto.com Arena 18,997
| 8–1
|-style="background:#fcc;"
| 10 
| November 7
| @ L.A. Clippers
| 
| Donovan Mitchell (30)
| Jarrett Allen (20)
| Darius Garland (12)
| Crypto.com Arena 16,516
| 8–2
|-style="background:#fcc;"
| 11
| November 9
| @ Sacramento
| 
| Donovan Mitchell (38)
| Caris LeVert (10)
| Darius Garland (8)
| Golden 1 Center13,816
| 8–3
|-style="background:#fcc;"
| 12
| November 11
| @ Golden State
| 
| Donovan Mitchell (29)
| Evan Mobley (13)
| Donovan Mitchell (9)
| Chase Center 18,064
| 8–4
|-style="background:#fcc;"
| 13
| November 13
| Minnesota
| 
| Darius Garland (51)
| Evan Mobley (13)
| Darius Garland (6)
| Rocket Mortgage FieldHouse 19,432
| 8–5
|-style="background:#fcc;"
| 14
| November 16
| @ Milwaukee
| 
| Garland, Mitchell (23)
| Love, E. Mobley (7)
| Darius Garland (8)
| Fiserv Forum 17,341
| 8–6
|-style="background:#cfc;"
| 15
| November 18
| Charlotte
| 
| Darius Garland (41)
| Evan Mobley (18)
| Garland, Mitchell (6)
| Rocket Mortgage FieldHouse19,432
| 9–6
|-style="background:#cfc;"
| 16
| November 20
| Miami
| 
| Darius Garland (25)
| Cedi Osman (12)
| Darius Garland (7)
| Rocket Mortgage FieldHouse19,432
| 10–6
|-style="background:#cfc;"
| 17
| November 21
| Atlanta
| 
| Donovan Mitchell (29)
| Jarrett Allen (11)
| Garland, Mitchell (9)
| Rocket Mortgage FieldHouse19,432
| 11–6
|-style="background:#cfc;"
| 18
| November 23
| Portland
| 
| Donovan Mitchell (34)
| Jarrett Allen (13)
| Darius Garland (12)
| Rocket Mortgage FieldHouse19,432
| 12–6
|-style="background:#fcc;"
| 19
| November 25
| @ Milwaukee
| 
| Donovan Mitchell (29)
| Dean Wade (12)
| Darius Garland (3)
| Fiserv Forum17,447
| 12–7
|-style="background:#cfc;"
| 20
| November 27
| @ Detroit
| 
| Donovan Mitchell (32)
| Evan Mobley (13)
| Darius Garland (10)
| Little Caesars Arena18,240
| 13–7
|-style="background:#fcc;"
| 21
| November 28
| @ Toronto
| 
| Garland, Mobley (18)
| Evan Mobley (15)
| Darius Garland (10)
| Scotiabank Arena19,800
| 13–8
|-style="background:#cfc;"
| 22
| November 30
| Philadelphia
| 
| Caris LeVert (22)
| Evan Mobley (8)
| Darius Garland (9)
| Rocket Mortgage FieldHouse19,432
| 14–8

|-style="background:#cfc;"
| 23
| December 2
| Orlando
| 
| Donovan Mitchell (34)
| Evan Mobley (13)
| Darius Garland (6)
| Rocket Mortgage FieldHouse19,432
| 15–8
|-style="background:#fcc;"
| 24
| December 4
| @ New York
| 
| Donovan Mitchell (23)
| Evan Mobley (10)
| Donovan Mitchell (5)
| Madison Square Garden19,007
| 15–9
|-style="background:#cfc;"
| 25
| December 6
| L.A. Lakers
| 
| Donovan Mitchell (43)
| Evan Mobley (12)
| Darius Garland (11)
| Rocket Mortgage FieldHouse19,432
| 16–9
|-style="background:#fcc;"
| 26
| December 9
| Sacramento
| 
| Caris LeVert (22)
| Allen, Stevens (8)
| Garland, LeVert (6)
| Rocket Mortgage FieldHouse19,432
| 16–10
|-style="background:#cfc;"
| 27
| December 10
| Oklahoma City
| 
| Caris LeVert (22)
| Evan Mobley (12)
| Darius Garland (8)
| Rocket Mortgage FieldHouse19,432
| 17–10
|-style="background:#fcc;"
| 28
| December 12
| @ San Antonio
| 
| Donovan Mitchell (28)
| Evan Mobley (13)
| Darius Garland (9)
| AT&T Center13,434
| 17–11
|-style="background:#cfc;"
| 29
| December 14
| @ Dallas
| 
| Donovan Mitchell (34)
| Lamar Stevens (11)
| Garland, E. Mobley (6)
| American Airlines Center20,093
| 18–11
|-style="background:#cfc;"
| 30
| December 16
| Indiana
| 
| Donovan Mitchell (41)
| Evan Mobley (9)
| Darius Garland (10)
| Rocket Mortgage FieldHouse19,432
| 19–11
|-style="background:#cfc;"
| 31
| December 17
| Dallas
| 
| Donovan Mitchell (25)
| Jarrett Allen (15)
| Darius Garland (12)
| Rocket Mortgage FieldHouse19,432
| 20–11
|-style="background:#cfc;"
| 32
| December 19
| Utah
| 
| Donovan Mitchell (23)
| Jarrett Allen (11)
| Darius Garland (8)
| Rocket Mortgage FieldHouse19,432
| 21–11
|-style="background:#cfc;"
| 33
| December 21
| Milwaukee
| 
| Donovan Mitchell (39)
| Kevin Love (9)
| Donovan Mitchell (6)
| Rocket Mortgage FieldHouse19,432
| 22–11
|-style="background:#fcc;"
| 34
| December 23
| Toronto
| 
| Darius Garland (17)
| Evan Mobley (8)
| Darius Garland (8)
| Rocket Mortgage FieldHouse19,432
| 22–12
|-style="background:#fcc;"
| 35
| December 26
| Brooklyn
| 
| Darius Garland (46)
| Jarrett Allen (11)
| Darius Garland (8)
| Rocket Mortgage FieldHouse19,432
| 22–13
|-style="background:#fcc;"
| 36
| December 29
| @ Indiana
| 
| Donovan Mitchell (28)
| Jarrett Allen (14)
| Darius Garland (8)
| Gainbridge Fieldhouse17,274
| 22–14
|-style="background:#cfc;"
| 37
| December 31
| @ Chicago
| 
| Caris LeVert (23)
| Jarrett Allen (10)
| Donovan Mitchell (6)
| United Center21,524
| 23–14

|-style="background:#cfc;"
| 38
| January 2
| Chicago
| 
| Donovan Mitchell (71)
| Kevin Love (17)
| Donovan Mitchell (11)
| Rocket Mortgage FieldHouse19,432
| 24–14
|-style="background:#cfc;"
| 39
| January 4
| Phoenix
| 
| Caris LeVert (21)
| Allen, Love, E. Mobley (8)
| Donovan Mitchell (9)
| Rocket Mortgage FieldHouse19,432
| 25–14
|-style="background:#fcc;"
| 40
| January 6
| @ Denver
| 
| Caris LeVert (22)
| Allen, E. Mobley (9)
| Darius Garland (8)
| Ball Arena19,638
| 25–15
|-style="background:#cfc;"
| 41
| January 8
| @ Phoenix
| 
| Garland, Mitchell (22)
| Jarrett Allen (12)
| Garland, LeVert (7)
| Footprint Center17,071 
| 26–15
|-style="background:#fcc;"
| 42
| January 10
| @ Utah
| 
| Donovan Mitchell (46)
| Kevin Love (9)
| Garland, Mitchell (6)
| Vivint Arena18,206 
| 26–16
|-style="background:#cfc;"
| 43
| January 12
| @ Portland
| 
| Donovan Mitchell (26)
| Jarrett Allen (10)
| Darius Garland (10)
| Moda Center18,312
| 27–16
|-style="background:#fcc;"
| 44
| January 14
| @ Minnesota
| 
| Allen, E. Mobley (19)
| Allen, Love, E. Mobley (8)
| Donovan Mitchell (6)
| Target Center17,136
| 27–17
|-style="background:#cfc;"
| 45
| January 16
| New Orleans
| 
| Darius Garland (30)
| Jarrett Allen (11)
| Darius Garland (11)
| Rocket Mortgage FieldHouse19,432
| 28–17
|-style="background:#fcc;"
| 46
| January 18
| @ Memphis
| 
| Darius Garland (24)
| Evan Mobley (15)
| Darius Garland (14)
| FedExForum16,892
| 28–18
|-style="background:#fcc;"
| 47
| January 20
| Golden State
| 
| Darius Garland (31)
| Jarrett Allen (8)
| Darius Garland (10)
| Rocket Mortgage FieldHouse19,432
| 28–19
|-style="background:#cfc;"
| 48
| January 21
| Milwaukee
| 
| Evan Mobley (38)
| Evan Mobley (9)
| Darius Garland (10)
| Rocket Mortgage FieldHouse19,432
| 29–19
|-style="background:#fcc;"
| 49
| January 24
| @ New York
| 
| Allen, Mitchell (24)
| Jarrett Allen (12)
| Donovan Mitchell (8)
| Madison Square Garden19,812
| 29–20
|-style="background:#cfc;"
| 50
| January 26
| @ Houston
| 
| Darius Garland (26)
| Allen, Mobley (10)
| Darius Garland (9)
| Toyota Center16,327
| 30–20
|-style="background:#fcc;"
| 51
| January 27
| @ Oklahoma City
| 
| Darius Garland (31)
| Evan Mobley (11)
| Darius Garland (13)
| Paycom Center16,236
| 30–21
|-style="background:#cfc;"
| 52
| January 29
| L.A. Clippers
| 
| Cedi Osman (29)
| Evan Mobley (9)
| Darius Garland (10)
| Rocket Mortgage FieldHouse19,432
| 31–21
|-style="background:#fcc;"
| 53
| January 31
| Miami
| 
| Evan Mobley (19)
| Jarrett Allen (11)
| Donovan Mitchell (9)
| Rocket Mortgage FieldHouse19,432
| 31–22

|-style="background:#cfc;"
| 54
| February 2
| Memphis
| 
| Darius Garland (32)
| Evan Mobley (14)
| Darius Garland (11)
| Rocket Mortgage FieldHouse19,432
| 32–22
|-style="background:#cfc;"
| 55
| February 5
| @ Indiana
| 
| Darius Garland (24)
| Jarrett Allen (13)
| Ricky Rubio (9)
| Gainbridge Fieldhouse17,274
| 33–22
|-style="background:#cfc;"
| 56
| February 6
| @ Washington
| 
| Allen, Garland (23)
| Allen, LeVert (8)
| Garland, Mitchell (5)
| Capital One Arena16,744
| 34–22
|-style="background:#cfc;"
| 57
| February 8
| Detroit
| 
| Jarrett Allen (20)
| Jarrett Allen (14)
| Raul Neto (8)
| Rocket Mortgage FieldHouse19,432
| 35–22
|-style="background:#cfc;"
| 58
| February 10
| @ New Orleans
| 
| Donovan Mitchell (30)
| Evan Mobley (13)
| Caris LeVert (9)
| Smoothie King Center16,398
| 36–22
|-style="background:#cfc;"
| 59
| February 11
| Chicago
| 
| Donovan Mitchell (29)
| Allen, Mitchell (10)
| Darius Garland (7)
| Rocket Mortgage FieldHouse19,432
| 37–22
|-style="background:#cfc;"
| 60
| February 13
| San Antonio
| 
| Donovan Mitchell (41)
| Jarrett Allen (11)
| Darius Garland (7)
| Rocket Mortgage FieldHouse19,432
| 38–22
|-style="background:#fcc;"
| 61
| February 15
| @ Philadelphia
| 
| Donovan Mitchell (33)
| Evan Mobley (9)
| Darius Garland (6)
| Wells Fargo Center21,134
| 38–23
|-style="background:#fcc;"
| 62
| February 23
| Denver
| 
| Evan Mobley (31)
| Jarrett Allen (13)
| Caris LeVert (9)
| Rocket Mortgage FieldHouse19,432
| 38–24
|-style="background:#fcc;"
| 63
| February 24
| @ Atlanta
| 
| Darius Garland (33)
| Jarrett Allen (9)
| Neto, Stevens (4)
| State Farm Arena18,065
| 38–25
|-style="background:#cfc;"
| 64
| February 26
| Toronto
| 
| Donovan Mitchell (35)
| Jarrett Allen (11)
| Darius Garland (11)
| Rocket Mortgage FieldHouse19,432
| 39–25

|-style="background:#fcc;"
| 65
| March 1
| @ Boston
| 
| Donovan Mitchell (44)
| Evan Mobley (13)
| Darius Garland (9)
| TD Garden19,156
| 39–26
|-style="background:#cfc;"
| 66
| March 4
| Detroit
| 
| Darius Garland (21)
| Evan Mobley (11)
| Darius Garland (7)
| Rocket Mortgage FieldHouse19,432
| 40–26
|-style="background:#cfc;"
| 67
| March 6
| Boston
| 
| Donovan Mitchell (40)
| Evan Mobley (17)
| Darius Garland (12)
| Rocket Mortgage FieldHouse19,432
| 41–26
|-style="background:#cfc;"
| 68
| March 8
| @ Miami
| 
| Darius Garland (25)
| Jarrett Allen (12)
| Darius Garland (7)
| Miami-Dade Arena19,600
| 42–26
|-style="background:#fcc;"
| 69
| March 10
| @ Miami
| 
| Donovan Mitchell (42)
| Jarrett Allen (13)
| Ricky Rubio (8)
| Miami-Dade Arena19,757
| 42–27
|-style="background:#cfc;"
| 70
| March 12
| @ Charlotte
| 
| Darius Garland (28)
| Evan Mobley (9)
| Darius Garland (6)
| Spectrum Center17,342
| 43–27
|-style="background:#cfc;"
| 71
| March 14
| @ Charlotte
| 
| Evan Mobley (26)
| Evan Mobley (6)
| Garland, LeVert (7)
| Spectrum Center14,690
| 44–27
|-style="background:#fcc;"
| 72
| March 15
| Philadelphia
| 
| Caris LeVert (24)
| Evan Mobley (12)
| Caris LeVert (6)
| Rocket Mortgage FieldHouse19,432
| 44–28
|-style="background:#cfc;"
| 73
| March 17
| Washington
| 
| Darius Garland (24)
| Evan Mobley (8)
| Darius Garland (9)
| Rocket Mortgage FieldHouse19,432
| 45–28
|-style"background:#;"
| 74
| March 21
| @ Brooklyn
| 
|
|
|
| Barclays Center
|
|-style"background:#;"
| 75
| March 23
| @ Brooklyn
| 
|
|
|
| Barclays Center
|
|-style"background:#;"
| 76
| March 26
| Houston
| 
|
|
|
| Rocket Mortgage FieldHouse
|
|-style"background:#;"
| 77
| March 28
| @ Atlanta
| 
|
|
|
| State Farm Arena
|
|-style"background:#;"
| 78
| March 31
| New York
| 
|
|
|
| Rocket Mortgage FieldHouse
|

|-style"background:#;"
| 79
| April 2
| Indiana
| 
|
|
|
| Rocket Mortgage FieldHouse
|
|-style"background:#;"
| 80
| April 4
| @ Orlando
| 
|
|
|
| Amway Center
|
|-style"background:#;"
| 81
| April 6
| @ Orlando
| 
|
|
|
| Amway Center
|
|-style"background:#;"
| 82
| April 9
| Charlotte
| 
|
|
|
| Rocket Mortgage FieldHouse
|

Transactions

Trades

Free agency

Re-signed

Additions

Subtractions

References 

Cleveland Cavaliers seasons
Cleveland Cavaliers
Cleveland Cavaliers
Cleveland Cavaliers